This is a list of 194 sources that list elements classified as metalloids. The sources are listed in chronological order. Lists of metalloids differ since there is no rigorous widely accepted definition of metalloid (or its occasional alias, 'semi-metal'). Individual lists share common ground, with variations occurring at the margins. The elements most often regarded as metalloids are boron, silicon, germanium, arsenic, antimony and tellurium. Other sources may subtract from this list, add a varying number of other elements, or both.

Overview

Chronological list
This table show which elements are included in each of 194 different lists of metalloids. A parenthesized symbol indicates an element whose inclusion in a particular metalloid list is qualified in some way by the author(s). The 'citations' rows show how many and what percentage of the authorities consider each element to be a metalloid, with qualified citations counted as one-half.

There is an average of 7.15 elements per metalloid list.

Appearance frequency clusters

Elements cited in the listed sources (as of August 2011; n = 194) have appearance frequencies that occur in clusters of comparable values. The diamonds in the graph mark the mean appearance frequency of each cluster. Cluster 1 (93%) = B, Si, Ge, As, Sb, Te; cluster 2 (44%) = Po, At; cluster 3 (24%) = Se; cluster 4 (9%) = C, Al; cluster 5 (5%) = Be, P, Bi; cluster 6 (3%) = Sn; and cluster 7 (1%) = H, Ga, S, I, Pb, Fl, Mc, Lv, Ts. The resulting geometric trend line has the formula y = 199.47e−0.7423x and an R2 value of 0.9962.

Elements regarded as metalloids
The elements commonly classified as metalloids are boron, silicon, germanium, arsenic, antimony and tellurium.
The status of polonium and astatine is not settled. Most authors recognise one or the other, or both, as metalloids; Herman, Hoffmann and Ashcroft, on the basis of relativistic modelling, predict astatine will be a monatomic metal. One or more of carbon, aluminium, phosphorus, selenium, tin or bismuth, these being periodic table neighbours of the elements commonly classified as metalloids, are sometimes recognised as metalloids.
Selenium, in particular, is commonly designated as a metalloid in environmental chemistry on account of similarities in its aquatic chemistry with that of arsenic and antimony. There are fewer references to beryllium, in spite of its periodic table position adjoining the dividing line between metals and nonmetals. Isolated references in the literature can also be found to the categorisation of other elements as metalloids. These elements include: hydrogen, nitrogen, sulfur, zinc, gallium, iodine, lead, and radon (citations are for references other than those listed above).

Notes

References

Lists of chemical elements